Rob Koll is an American college wrestling coach.  He is currently head wrestling coach at Stanford University.  He is the son of Wrestling Hall of Fame member and three-time NCAA wrestling champion Bill Koll.

Wrestling career
As a wrestler for the University of North Carolina, Koll was a four-time All American, three-time ACC champion, and the 1988 NCAA champion at 158 pounds. After college, he competed internationally in freestyle wrestling. In 1989 he won the Pan-Am Games and was runner-up at the Olympic Festival; he won the U.S. national freestyle championship in 1990 and 1991; took first in the 1990 and 1993 World Cup; placed fifth in the 1991 World Championships; won the 1992 World Cup Grand Prix; and was the alternate for the 1992 Olympic Games.

Coaching career
Koll joined Cornell University as an assistant wrestling coach in 1989.  He became head wrestling coach at the school in 1993.  He led Cornell to six top-five finishes in the NCAA Division I wrestling tournament, including second-place finishes in 2010 and 2011.  The 2010 and 2011 finishes were the best ever for an Ivy League team. The 2011 team was ranked first for much of the season, but lost in the NCAA tournament to Penn State, which surged under its coach Cael Sanderson, who was in his second year at Penn State.  Koll has coached NCAA champions Yianni Diakomihalis (2018 (141)), Gabe Dean (2015 (184) & 2016 (184)), Nahshon Garrett (2016 (133)), Kyle Dake (2010 (141), 2011 (149), 2012 (157) & 2013 (165)), Steve Bosak (2012 (184)), Cam Simaz (2012 (197)), Troy Nickerson (2009 (125)),  Jordan Leen (2008 (157)), Travis Lee (2003 (125) & 2005 (133)), and David Hirsch (1994 (126)). Koll has been won multiple coaching awards including Ivy League Coach of the Year (2015, 2016, 2017) and EIWA Coach of the Year (2007, 2010, 2011, 2017) and NWCA National Coach of the Year (2005).

He became head wrestling coach at Stanford University in 2021.

Personal life
Rob Koll was raised in State College, Pennsylvania.  His father, Bill Koll, was a legendary three-time NCAA wrestling champion for Iowa State Teachers College (now the University of Northern Iowa), and a fifth-place finisher at the 1948 London Olympics.  Bill later became the head coach at Penn State University, and from 1965-1978 he led the team to a 127-22-7 record.

References

External links
 Cornell University Profile of Rob Koll
 Stanford University Profile of Rob Koll

Living people
American wrestlers
Cornell University faculty
American wrestling coaches
College wrestling coaches in the United States
Year of birth missing (living people)